Bowie State is a regional rail station on the Northeast Corridor, located adjacent to the campus of Bowie State University in Bowie, Maryland. It is served by MARC Penn Line commuter rail trains. The station is located on a three-track section of the Northeast Corridor, with two side platforms next to the outer tracks.

History
The Baltimore and Potomac Railroad (B&P) opened its main line in 1872, with a station at Bowie but not at Jericho Park. The B&P was merged into the Pennsylvania Railroad (PRR) in 1902. The PRR opened Jericho Park station, located at the modern station site, to serve the Maryland Normal and Industrial School (the predecessor to Bowie State College) around 1911.

The PRR folded into Penn Central in 1968. Conrail took over the ex-PRR Baltimore-Washington service, soon subsidized by the Maryland Department of Transportation, from Penn Central at its creation on April 1, 1976. Conrail operated service to the station until June 26, 1981. It was closed as the Jericho Park Road grade crossing was eliminated by the Laurel-Bowie Road overpass.

Bowie State station was opened on February 27, 1989, as a replacement for the Bowie station,  to the south. Bowie State provided parking lots – not possible to construct at Bowie – and better road access to surrounding suburban areas. This was one of the first major station projects undertaken under the MARC branding.

References

External links

 Station from Google Maps Street View

MARC Train stations
Penn Line
Stations on the Northeast Corridor
Buildings and structures in Bowie, Maryland
Railway stations in the United States opened in 1989
Railway stations in Prince George's County, Maryland
Bowie State University
Railway stations in Maryland at university and college campuses
1989 establishments in Maryland